The Industrial Fasteners Institute (IFI) is a respected Independence, Ohio based trade and standards organization and publisher. Among their publications is the frequently cited "IFI Fastener Technology Handbook", a reference available in hardcover and frequently used as a design guide by mechanical engineers, machinists, and others involved in the production of high-quality machine screws, bolts, nuts and other engineered fasteners.

References

Trade associations based in the United States